How to Eat Fried Worms is a 2006 American comedy film written and directed by Bob Dolman and produced by Mark Johnson and Philip Steuer with music by Mark Mothersbaugh and Robert Mothersbaugh. It is loosely based on Thomas Rockwell's 1973 children's book of the same name. It was also produced by Walden Media, and distributed by New Line Cinema.

Development began in 1998, and the theatrical release for the United States and Canada was August 25, 2006. The film stars Luke Benward, Adam Hicks, Hallie Eisenberg, Austin Rogers, Andrew Gillingham, Alexander Gould, Blake Garrett, and Philip Daniel Bolden. The film received mixed reviews from critics.

Plot
Billy Forrester has a weak stomach and vomits easily. He and his parents, Mitch, Helen, and his little brother, Woody, have just moved to a new town. Billy tells his mother he doesn't want to go to school because he will be "the new kid". She assures him he will make friends and everything will be okay.

Billy becomes the target of the school bully, Joe Guire, his two "toaders" Plug and Bradley, and the rest of his gang: Benjy, Techno-Mouth, Twitch, and Donny. Plug and Bradley steal Billy's lunch box. Billy sits behind Erika Tansy, an unusually tall girl whom people make fun of.

At lunch, Billy opens his thermos and pours out a pile of live earthworms. Sickened, he almost vomits. Joe asks Billy if he eats worms. Billy says "I eat them all the time", then throws a worm at Joe's face. A nerd named Adam Simms was sure that Joe was going to punch Billy with "The Death Ring"; it is rumored that whoever Joe punches it with dies in 8th grade.

Joe, Plug, and Benjy catch up with Billy as he heads home. Joe proposes a bet: Billy will eat ten worms on the coming Saturday without throwing up, or he will have to walk around the school with worms in his pants. Billy knows that he cannot back out of the bet, so he accepts.

The next day, Billy is teamed up with Adam. While the boys cook the first worm "Le Big Porker" in the park they are chased by a park ranger for using a grill without adult supervision. Adam then takes them to his uncle Ed's restaurant The Brown Toad, and cooks up the second worm in an omelette. However, his uncle takes the omelette and gives it to their principal who then eats it. Adam then has to cook the second and third worms again, dubbing the creation "The Greasy Brown Toad Bloater Special," (where he dunks the worms in the fryer and smears liver juice on them). When Ed discovers the worms, he kicks the boys out of his restaurant. After Billy eats the fourth worm, "The Burning Fireball," and burns his mouth, Twitch and Techno-Mouth quit Joe's team and become his new best friends. Billy, Techno-Mouth, Twitch, and Adam then go to a convenience store. They find Adam playing Dance Dance Revolution, and one of the boys spills his drink, causing the machine to blow up and they get kicked out. At the playground, Billy eats the next three worms, "Magni-Fried," "Barfmallo," and "Peanut Butter and Worm Jam Sandwich."

After dinner, the boys go to a bait shop, where Billy eats the next two worms, "The Green Slusher" and "Radioactive Slime Delight," (where Donny puts the worm in the microwave) while the owner is out, but her unexpected return leads to her briefly chasing them for breaking into her bait shop. After Joe cheats in an attempt to keep Billy from eating the last worm, "Worm A La Mud," all of his gang leaves and joins Billy's team. Erika is able to use her archery skills to get the final worm needed to Billy and he eats it before the deadline. Nigel Guire, Joe's brother, tries to bully and humiliate Joe; but Billy and the rest of the gang stand up for him, telling Nigel to leave him alone, and he leaves.

After thinking it over that night, Billy returns to school. He explains to Joe that the second worm was eaten by their principal, Burdock, when Adam accidentally put it in his omelet at the Brown Toad. They come to the conclusion neither of them technically won so they both put a bunch of worms down their pants and walk through the hallway. They are then interrupted by Burdock, who nearly catches them when a worm falls out of Billy's pants, which Joe covers up with his shoe. After Burdock returns to his office, the kids all run outside and celebrate as Billy and Joe both take the worms out of their pants and throw them into the air.

Cast

 Luke Benward as Billy "Wormboy" Forrester 
 Hallie Kate Eisenberg as Erika "Erk" Tansy
 Adam Hicks as Joe Guire
 Tom Cavanagh as Mitch Forrester, Billy's father
 Kimberly Williams-Paisley as Helen Forrester, Billy's mother
 Austin Rogers as Adam Simms
 Alexander Gould as Twitch
 Ryan Malgarini as Benjamin "Benjy" Renfro
 Philip Daniel Bolden as Bradley
 Clint Howard as Uncle Ed Simms, Adam's paternal uncle
 Ty Panitz as Woody Forrester, Billy's younger brother
 James Rebhorn as Principal Nelson "Boilerhead" Burdock
 Andrew Gillingham as Techno Mouth
 Blake Garrett as Plug
 Alexander Agate as Donny
 Nick Krause as Nigel Guire, Joe's older brother
 Andrea Martin as Mrs. Bommley
 David Bewley as Rob Simon
 Karen Wacker as Mrs. Simon
 Simone White as Woody's teacher
 Jo Ann Farabee as Bait Shop Lady
 Tom Brainard as Security Guard
 Tim Mateer as Convenience Store Clerk

Production
The film began development in 1996 after film rights were acquired by Imagine Entertainment. John August was hired to write the screenplay in his first paid screenwriting job and Thomas Schlamme was attached to direct. They went through four different drafts but neither August nor Schlamme had really connected with each other. Eventually, Bob Dolman was brought on for rewrites. Universal Pictures put the film in turnaround, and Nickelodeon Movies bought the film from them. Schlamme was later replaced with Joe Nussbaum. Eventually, Nickelodeon dropped the film and it remained in development hell until Walden Media came in to finance and produce the film. New Line Cinema entered as distributor and Dolman decided to direct his own script. Shooting began in July 2005.

August chose not to acquire a screenwriting credit via WGA rules, as very little of his initial screenplay remained in the finalized product.

Differences from the book
Though the film and the book share the concept about a bet between boys to eat earthworms, the nature of the situation differs significantly. In the book, the characters consist of four boys who are friends hanging around during the summertime. Billy has to eat fifteen worms in fifteen days, and the terms of the bet are fifty dollars, which he intends to use to buy a dirt bike.

Many of the film's subplots, that he is new in school, that Joe is a bully, that Billy has a weak stomach, and that Joe threatens him with a Death Ring, do not appear in the book. Unlike in the film, his parents eventually find out about the bet, which he ultimately wins instead of tying. All the worms he eats in the book are nightcrawlers, and Erika, the girl who helps him in the film, is not introduced until the book's sequel, How to Fight a Girl.

Reception

Box office
The film debuted at #11, with $4,003,537 in the United States and Canada. It closed seven weeks later, with a total of $13,040,527 domestically, and $55,787 overseas, for a worldwide total of $13,096,314.

Critical reception
The film mostly received mixed-to-positive reviews.  The site's consensus reads: "This Fear Factor for kids is good-natured and tasty enough." Metacritic gave the film a score of 56, indicating "mixed or average reviews".

The Filthy Critic gave the film four out of five "fingers" for its realistic portrayal of how children act. ReelViews' James Berardinelli gave a mildly positive review (2 stars out of 4) but thought the potential audience too narrow: "It's aimed at pre-teen males and doesn't make many concessions to members of other demographics." He went on to say: How to Eat Fried Worms belongs to a vanishing breed – live action family films. Even the best of the genre (like Holes and The Sisterhood of the Traveling Pants) don't draw large audiences, so mediocre productions like this one face an uphill struggle.  The Boston Globes reviewer – Ty Burr – gave it a 2 stars out of 4 and said when comparing the book to the film: There's a kid named Billy, and he eats worms on a dare, and that's about all the movie has in common with its source. Truth to tell, that's all the movie needs to have in common with its source. "This is really disgusting," my 9-year-old's friend whispered to her during the screening. Then he added, "But I like it."From a parent's viewpoint, two feet higher off the ground, How to Eat Fried Worms is lackadaisical stuff, easily the least of the unpretentious children's book adaptations produced by family-oriented Walden Media (Because of Winn-Dixie, Hoot, Holes).

Home media release
How to Eat Fried Worms was released on DVD on December 5, 2006, by New Line Home Entertainment.

Accolades

Soundtrack
 "The Tide Is High" – Performed by Matthew Sweet
 "Gone" – Performed by All Too Much
 "Baby Beluga" – Performed by Ty Panitz
 "Human Hands" – Written and Performed by Joe Mannix, Chris Peck, Bob Bruchu and Ed Fingerling
 "Get Ready for This" – Performed by 2 Unlimited
 "3 Little Bird" – Performed by Hallie Kate Eisenberg and Ty Panitz
 "Rocket Full of Power" – Performed by The Wipeouters
 "Move Your Feet" – Performed by Junior Senior
 "Jungle Boogie" – Performed by Kool & The Gang
 "Yum Yum Yum" – Performed by Mark Mothersbaugh, Robert Mothersbaugh (as Bob Mothersbaugh) and Bob Casale

References

Sources
 celebritywonder.com Accessed June 18, 2008.

External links
 
 

2006 films
2000s children's comedy films
American films with live action and animation
American children's comedy films
Films scored by Mark Mothersbaugh
Films based on children's books
Films shot in Texas
Walden Media films
New Line Cinema films
Films based on American novels
2006 comedy films
Films about bullying
2000s English-language films
2000s American films
Films about worms